Programming languages can be grouped by the number and types of paradigms supported.

Paradigm summaries
A concise reference for the programming paradigms listed in this article.

 Concurrent programming – have language constructs for concurrency, these may involve multi-threading, support for distributed computing, message passing, shared resources (including shared memory), or futures
 Actor programming – concurrent computation with actors that make local decisions in response to the environment (capable of selfish or competitive behaviour)
 Constraint programming – relations between variables are expressed as constraints (or constraint networks), directing allowable solutions (uses constraint satisfaction or simplex algorithm)
 Dataflow programming – forced recalculation of formulas when data values change (e.g. spreadsheets)
 Declarative programming – describes what computation should perform, without specifying detailed state changes c.f. imperative programming (functional and logic programming are major subgroups of declarative programming)
 Distributed programming – have support for multiple autonomous computers that communicate via computer networks
 Functional programming – uses evaluation of mathematical functions and avoids state and mutable data
 Generic programming – uses algorithms written in terms of to-be-specified-later types that are then instantiated as needed for specific types provided as parameters
 Imperative programming – explicit statements that change a program state
 Logic programming – uses explicit mathematical logic for programming
 Metaprogramming – writing programs that write or manipulate other programs (or themselves) as their data, or that do part of the work at compile time that would otherwise be done at runtime
 Template metaprogramming – metaprogramming methods in which a compiler uses templates to generate temporary source code, which is merged by the compiler with the rest of the source code and then compiled
 Reflective programming – metaprogramming methods in which a program modifies or extends itself
 Object-oriented programming – uses data structures consisting of data fields and methods together with their interactions (objects) to design programs
 Class-based – object-oriented programming in which inheritance is achieved by defining classes of objects, versus the objects themselves
 Prototype-based – object-oriented programming that avoids classes and implements inheritance via cloning of instances
 Pipeline programming – a simple syntax change to add syntax to nest function calls to language originally designed with none
 Rule-based programming – a network of rules of thumb that comprise a knowledge base and can be used for expert systems and problem deduction & resolution
 Visual programming – manipulating program elements graphically rather than by specifying them textually (e.g. Simulink); also termed diagrammatic programming

Language overview

See also
 Programming paradigm
 List of programming languages by type
 Domain-specific language
 Domain-specific multimodeling

Notes

Citations

References
 Jim Coplien, Multiparadigm Design for C++, Addison-Wesley Professional, 1998.

Programming paradigms
Programming language comparisons